Thuillier is a surname. Notable people with the surname include:

Elisabeth Thuillier (fl. 1890s-1920s), French colourist
Émilie Thuillier, Canadian politician
Emilio Thuillier (1868–1940), Spanish actor
Harry Thuillier (1925–2011), Irish fencer
Henry Edward Landor Thuillier (1813–1906), British surveyor in India
Henry Fleetwood Thuillier (1868–1953), British Army officer
Henry Shakespear Thuillier (1895–1982), British Army officer
Henry Ravenshaw Thuillier (1838–1922), British surveyor in India
Jacques Thuillier (1928– 2011), French art historian
Jean Thuillier (born 1921), French novelist
Leslie de Malapert Thuillier (1905–1999), British Army officer
Louis Thuillier (1856–1883), French biologist
Luc Thuillier (born 1964), French actor
Nick Thuillier, Irish fencer